Pontus or Pontos may refer to:

 Short Latin name for the Pontus Euxinus, the Greek name for the Black Sea (aka the Euxine sea)
 Pontus (mythology), a sea god in Greek mythology
 Pontus (region), on the southern coast of the Black Sea, in modern-day Turkey
 Kingdom of Pontus or Pontic Empire, a state founded in 281 BC
 Diocese of Pontus, a diocese of the later Roman Empire
 Republic of Pontus, a proposed Pontic Greek state discussed in 1919
 Pontus (given name), a Swedish masculine given name
 Pontos (film), a 2008 dramatic short film

See also
 Pontic Greeks, Pontian Greeks or Pontians, an ethnically Greek group who traditionally lived in the region of the Black Sea
 Bithynia and Pontus, a Roman province
 Pontic (disambiguation), the corresponding adjective